Sally Hamilton-Fleming (born 14 April 1965) is an Australian hurdler. She competed in the women's 400 metres hurdles at the 1988 Summer Olympics.

References

1965 births
Living people
Athletes (track and field) at the 1988 Summer Olympics
Australian female hurdlers
Olympic athletes of Australia
Place of birth missing (living people)